The Immigration and Asylum Act 1999 (c 33) is an Act of Parliament of the United Kingdom. It followed a 1998 government white paper entitled "Fairer, Faster And Firmer – A Modern Approach To Immigration And Asylum". Its main aim was to create a faster system to deal with a backlog of cases. One of the most notable parts of the new law was to introduce the dispersal policy under section 95 of the Act. This system allowed for the creation of dispersal areas around the United Kingdom, where Asylum applicants would be accommodated while their claims for Asylum were reviewed.

References

United Kingdom Acts of Parliament 1999
Immigration law in the United Kingdom
Right of asylum legislation in the United Kingdom
Immigration legislation